Giuseppe Montalbano may refer to:
Giuseppe Montalbano (1895–1989), Italian politician, member of the National Council and Constituent National Assembly
Giuseppe Montalbano (1925–2021), Italian politician, mayor and senator